Pope John XVIII (died June or July 1009) was the bishop of Rome and nominal ruler of the Papal States from January 1004 (25 December 1003 NS) to his abdication in July 1009. He wielded little temporal power, ruling during the struggle between John Crescentius and Emperor Henry II for the control of Rome.

Family
John was born to the Fasano family in Rome. His father was a priest, either named Leo according to Johann Peter Kirsch, or Ursus according to Horace K Mann.

Pontificate
John owed his election to the influence and power of the Crescentii clan. During his whole pontificate, he was allegedly subordinate to the head of the Crescentii, who controlled Rome, the patricius (an aristocratic military leader) John Crescentius III. This period was disrupted by continuing conflicts between the Ottonian Emperor Henry II and Arduin of Ivrea, who had claimed the Kingdom of Italy in 1002 after the death of Emperor Otto III. Rome was wracked with bouts of plague, and Saracens operated freely out of the Emirate of Sicily ravaging the Tyrrhenian coasts.

As pope, John XVIII occupied his time mainly with details of ecclesiastical administration. He authorized a new Diocese of Bamberg to serve as a base for missionary activity among the Slavs, a concern of Henry II. He also adjudicated the over-reaching of the bishops of Sens and Orléans regarding the privileges of the abbot of Fleury. John was successful in creating, at least temporarily, a rapprochement between the Eastern and Western churches. His name could be found on Eastern diptychs and he was prayed for in Masses in Constantinople.

John XVIII abdicated in July 1009 and, according to one catalogue of popes, retired to a monastery, where he died shortly afterwards. His successor was Pope Sergius IV.

References

Sources 
 
 

 

1009 deaths
People from the Province of Fermo
Popes
Italian popes
11th-century archbishops
Year of birth unknown
Popes who abdicated
11th-century popes